The Hundred of Neales is a hundred and a locality within the County of Eyre, South Australia

The main towns of the hundred are Eudunda and Sutherlands.

References

Neales